Jan Ivar Svenneby (2 October 1936 – 15 February 2012) was a Norwegian chess player.

Biography
In the end of 1950s and begin of 1960s Jan Svenneby was one of the leading junior Norwegian chess players. In 1955, he won the Norwegian Junior Chess Championship.

Jan Svenneby played for Norway in the Chess Olympiad:
 In 1960, at first reserve board in the 14th Chess Olympiad in Leipzig (+1, =2, -1).

Jan Svenneby also successfully played in correspondence chess tournaments. In 1968, he won 3rd place in 3rd European Correspondence Chess Championship

References

External links

Jan Svenneby chess games at 365chess.com

1936 births
2012 deaths
Norwegian chess players
Chess Olympiad competitors